Abisara bifasciata, the double-banded Judy or twospot plum Judy, is a butterfly in the family Riodinidae. It is found in Asia.

Subspecies
Abisara bifasciata bifasciata (Andamans)
Abisara bifasciata angulata Moore, [1879] (Sikkim, Manipur, Nagaland to Myanmar)
Abisara bifasciata suffusa Moore, 1882 (India)

Description

References

Butterflies described in 1877
Abisara
Butterflies of Asia
Taxa named by Frederic Moore